The 2015 Kazakhstan First Division was the 21st edition of Kazakhstan First Division, the second level football competition in Kazakhstan. 13 teams played against each other on home-away system. The top team gains promotion to the Premier League next season, while the second-placed team enters playoff series with the eleventh team of the Premier League.

Teams

Stadia and locations

Foreign players
The number of foreign players is restricted to three per team. A team can use all of them on the field in each game.

In bold: Players that have been capped for their national team.

Last updated 22 August 2015.

League table

Promotion play-offs

Top scorers

Source:

References

External links
Professional Football League of Kazakhstan official website

Kazakhstan First Division seasons
2
Kazakhstan
Kazakhstan